The Linda McCartney Racing Team was a British professional road bicycle racing team.

History
The team began in 1998 with Linda McCartney Foods, maker of vegetarian food, sponsoring vegetarian riders and staff. The company was started by Sir Paul McCartney's wife, Linda. Team success would promote vegetarianism and Linda McCartney Foods.

The team was to compete in Britain before expanding to international events. It was initially composed of British riders with more experienced riders joining later to improve credentials for the UCI World Cup and the Grand Tours.

It was the first British team to ride the Giro d'Italia but the increase in cost as the team and its commitments grew — Linda McCartney Foods did not continue sponsorship — led the team to disband in 2001 with reported debts of more than US$1m and a dispute with the UCI over riders' wages.

In 2012, a British investigation was launched into the former team, with allegations that the management did not organise doping, but knew several riders used performance-enhancing drugs and turned a blind eye.

Notable riders
Íñigo Cuesta
Matt DeCanio
Pascal Richard
Max Sciandri
Matt Stephens
Bradley Wiggins
Charly Wegelius
David McKenzie
Ciarán Power

References

Further reading
 

Cycling teams based in the United Kingdom
Defunct cycling teams based in the United Kingdom
Cycling teams established in 1998
Cycling teams disestablished in 2001
Linda McCartney